This is a list of British anti-aircraft brigades that existed during the Second World War.

Anti-aircraft brigades

See also 
 British Army during the Second World War

Notes

References

 
 N.W. Routledge, History of the Royal Regiment of Artillery: Anti-Aircraft Artillery 1914–55, London: Royal Artillery Institution/Brassey's, 1994, .

British anti-aircraft brigades
Anti-aircraft brigades
Anti-aircraft brigades
Anti-aircraft brigades